Empress Dowager Xiaojing (27 February 1565 – 18 October 1611), of the Wang clan, was a Ming dynasty concubine of the Wanli Emperor and the biological mother of the Taichang Emperor. She was primarily known during her lifetime as Consort Gong, but is most commonly referred to by her posthumous name.

Biography
Wang joined the imperial court as a palace lady in the service of Empress Dowager Xiaoding. The Wanli Emperor met her whilst visiting his mother and began a relationship with her.

When Wang became pregnant, the emperor ignored her. Empress Dowager Xiaoding questioned her son and advised him to marry Wang, as he still had no sons. In the fourth lunar month of 1582, Wang was given the rank of Consort and the honorific Gong. Four months later, she gave birth to a son, who was given the name Zhu Changluo. Shortly before this in the same year, Empress Xiaoduanxian, the emperor's primary wife, had given birth to a daughter; the Princess Rongchang.

In 1584, Wang had a daughter named Zhu Xuanyuan (朱軒嫄).

Titles 
During the reign of the Jiajing Emperor (r. 1521–1567):
Lady Wang (王氏; 27 February 1565)
During the reign of the Wanli Emperor (r. 1572–1620):
Palace Lady (宮人; from 1578)
Consort Gong (恭妃; from 5 July 1582)
Imperial Noble Consort  (皇貴妃; from 1605)
Imperial Noble Consort Wensu Duanjing Chunyi (温肃端靖纯懿皇贵妃; from 1611)
During the reign of the Tianqi Emperor  (r. 1620–1627)
Empress Dowager Xiàojìng Wēnyì Jìngràng Zhēncí Cāntiān Yìnshèng (孝靖溫懿敬讓貞慈參天胤聖皇太后; from 1621)

Issue 
As Consort Gong: 
Taichang Emperor (泰昌帝 朱常洛; 28 August 1582 – 26 September 1620), the Wanli Emperor's first son
Princess Yunmeng (雲夢公主; 1584–1587), personal name Xuanyuan (軒嫄), the Wanli Emperor's fourth daughter

Succession dispute
Although Wang had given birth to the emperor's eldest son, the emperor's favourite concubine was Noble Consort Zheng, who also had a son. When the Wanli Emperor conferred the status of Imperial Noble Consort on Zheng in 1586, it became apparent to the court that he intended for her son, Zhu Changxun, to inherit the throne, which triggered more than a decade of court factionalism and conflict. This included attempts by officials to raise Wang's status to Noble Consort. Eventually, Wang's son was proclaimed heir apparent in 1601, as a result of pressure from both officials and Empress Dowager Xiaoding. However, Zhu Changxun was not dispatched to his provincial command in keeping with imperial customs until 1604.

In 1605, Wang was made Imperial Noble Consort. In 1606, the emperor conferred upon Wang the honorific name of Cisheng (慈圣) to celebrate the birth of Zhu Changluo's first son.

References

Citations

Cited sources 

 
 
 
 
 

1565 births
1611 deaths
Chinese ladies-in-waiting
Ming dynasty posthumous empresses
16th-century Chinese women
16th-century Chinese people
17th-century Chinese women
17th-century Chinese people